City marketing (related to city branding) or Place Marketing is the promotion of a city, or a district within it, with the aim of encouraging certain activities to take place there.

Place  marketing  "refers  to  the  application  of  marketing  instruments  to  geographical locations, such  as  cities,  towns,  regions  and  communities i.e. coordinated  use  of  marketing  tools  supported  by  a  shared customer-oriented  philosophy,  for  creating,  communicating,  delivering  and  exchanging urban  offerings  that  have  value  for  the  city's  customers  and  the  city's  community  at  large.

The orchestrated attempt to differentiate place (city/ town or cities) aims at associating through:

 Design: describing place as a character
 Infrastructure: describing place as a fixed environment
 Basic services: place as a service provider
 Attraction: place as entertainment or recreation

It is used to alter the external perceptions of a city in order to encourage tourism, attract inward migration of residents, or enable business relocation. A significant feature of city marketing is the development of new landmark, or 'flagship', buildings and structures. The development of cities as a marketable product has led to competition between them for inward investment and government funding. It is often manifested in the attempts by cities to attract international sporting events, such as the Olympic Games. Competition between cities exists at the regional, national and international level; and is an effect of globalisation.Some places are associated with certain brands and build on each other, but sometimes the commercial brand is so powerful that eclipses the place brand. An example of this is Maranello, Italy, which uses the Ferrari headquarters as a primary attraction for tourists.

City marketing can occur strategically or organically. An example of strategic city marketing is Las Vegas. The city is promoted through a variety of efforts with the strategic intent of acquiring cultural and economic bonuses. A case of organic city marketing is Jerusalem. The city is marketed without a grand strategy, as disorganized stakeholders over the course of centuries have glorified the city and encouraged pilgrimage, yielding cultural and economic bonuses. Both cases demonstrate city marketing, each with varying strategic and organic involvement. Generally, organic marketing occurs alongside strategic marketing, as the perception of the city is impossible to solely construct with strategic efforts.

According to Scott Cutlip, "one of the first, if not the first, municipal promotion programs" was led by Erastus Brainerd for the city of Seattle beginning in 1896. Seattle was in competition with Portland and Victoria as the preferred city in which to get supplied for the Klondike Gold Rush. A Bureau of Public Information was established within the city's Chamber of Commerce.

Like with any successful marketing effort, cities must be willing to commit to a long-term plan in order for their identity and message to be communicated effectively. A shared vision between stakeholders will help develop a cohesive overarching strategy for a city's image.

City Brand Index 
The City Brand Index is released biannually and ranks the image of 50 cities on 6 components: presence, place, potential, pulse, people, and prerequisites. In the 2015 report, Paris took the top spot, with London, New York, Sydney, and Los Angeles taking the 2nd–5th spots respectively.

See also

References

See also 
 

 Philip Kotler, Donald H. Haider, Irving J. Rein (1993) Marketing Places: attracting investment, industry, and tourism to cities, states, and nations, Free Press,  .

Promotion and marketing communications
Cities